Víctor Benítez Morales (12 September 1935 – 11 July 2022) was a Peruvian professional footballer who played as a centre-back or defensive midfielder. Nicknamed "El Conejo", he notably played for Italian clubs AC Milan, Roma and Inter Milan as well as Argentine club Boca Juniors. He won the European Cup title with AC Milan in 1963.

Along with José Velásquez, he is recognised as one of Peru's most important defensive midfielders of all time.

Club career
Born in Lima, Peru, Benítez began his career with Alianza Lima in 1950s. He won two Peruvian league titles in 1954 and 1955. In 1960 he joined Argentine club Boca Juniors where he was part of the team that won the 1962 league championship. 

Benítez moved to Italy in 1962, where he played for AC Milan, Messina, Roma, Venezia, and Inter Milan. In 1963, he was part of the AC Milan team that won the UEFA Champions League. He won a Coppa Italia title with Roma in 1969. 

He returned to Peru in 1971 where he played out the remainder of his career with Sporting Cristal.

International career
Between 1957 and 1959 he played 11 games for the Peru national team. He appeared for Peru in the Copa América in 1957 and 1959, playing in a total of seven games. Additionally, he played in FIFA World Cup qualification for his native country in 1957. On 17 May 1959, Benitez was part of the Peru national team which beat England 4–1 in Lima.

Death
Benítez died in Italy on 11 July 2022 at the age of 86.

Honours
Alianza Lima
Peruvian League: 1954, 1955

Boca Juniors
Primera División Argentina: 1962

AC Milan
European Cup: 1962–63

Roma
Coppa Italia: 1968–69

References

External links
 Boca Juniors profile 
InterArchive

1935 births
2022 deaths
Footballers from Lima
Peruvian footballers
Association football central defenders
Association football midfielders
Peru international footballers
UEFA Champions League winning players
Argentine Primera División players
Serie A players
Club Alianza Lima footballers
Boca Juniors footballers
A.C. Milan players
A.C.R. Messina players
Venezia F.C. players
Inter Milan players
A.S. Roma players
Sporting Cristal footballers
Peruvian expatriate footballers
Peruvian expatriate sportspeople in Argentina
Expatriate footballers in Argentina
Peruvian expatriate sportspeople in Italy
Expatriate footballers in Italy